Fred Perry successfully defended his title, defeating Gottfried von Cramm in the final, 6–2, 6–4, 6–4 to win the gentlemen's singles tennis title at the 1935 Wimbledon Championships.

Seeds

  Fred Perry (champion)
  Gottfried von Cramm (final)
  Jack Crawford (semifinals)
  Bunny Austin (quarterfinals)
  Wilmer Allison (first round)
  Sidney Wood (quarterfinals)
  Roderich Menzel (quarterfinals)
  Christian Boussus (fourth round)

Draw

Finals

Top half

Section 1

Section 2

Section 3

Section 4

Bottom half

Section 5

Section 6

Section 7

Section 8

References

External links

Men's Singles
Wimbledon Championship by year – Men's singles